The state funeral of Edward VII, King of the United Kingdom of Great Britain and Ireland and Emperor of India, occurred on Friday, 20 May 1910.

The funeral was the largest gathering of European royalty ever to take place, and the last before many royal families were deposed in the First World War and its aftermath.

Death and funeral preparations

On 27 April 1910 the King returned to Buckingham Palace from France, suffering from severe bronchitis. Queen Alexandra returned from visiting her brother, George I of Greece, in Corfu a week later on 5 May.

On 6 May, Edward suffered several heart attacks, but refused to go to bed, saying, "No, I shall not give in; I shall go on; I shall work to the end." Between moments of faintness, his son the Prince of Wales (shortly to be King George V) told him that his horse, Witch of the Air, had won at Kempton Park that afternoon. The King replied, "Yes, I have heard of it. I am very glad": his final words. At 11:30 p.m. he lost consciousness for the last time and was put to bed. He died 15 minutes later.

Alexandra refused to allow Edward's body to be moved for eight days afterwards, though she allowed small groups of visitors to enter his room. On 11 May, the King was dressed in his uniform and placed in a massive oak coffin, which was moved on 14 May to the throne room, where it was sealed and lay in state.

Following that private lying in state, on 17 May the coffin was taken in procession to Westminster Hall, where there was a public lying in state. This was the first to be held in the hall for a member of the royal family and was inspired by the lying in state of William Gladstone there in 1898. A short service was held at the arrival of the coffin, with the combined choirs of Westminster Abbey and the Chapel Royal singing the hymn Praise, my soul, the King of heaven at the request of Queen Mary, although it was noted that their voices were drowned by the accompanying military band.

On the first day, thousands of members of the public queued patiently in the rain to pay their respects; some 25,000 people were turned away when the gates were closed at 10 pm. On 19 May, Emperor Wilhelm II of Germany, wanted to have the hall closed while he laid a wreath; however, the police advised that there might be disorder if that happened, so the emperor was taken in through another entrance while the public continued to file past. An estimated half a million people visited the hall during the three days that it was open.

The funeral was held two weeks after the King's death on 20 May.  Huge crowds, estimated at between three and five million, gathered to watch the procession, the route of which was lined by 35,000 soldiers.  It passed from Buckingham Palace to Westminster Hall, where a small ceremony was conducted by the Archbishop of Canterbury, Randall Davidson, before a small group of official mourners – the late King's widow Queen Alexandra, his son King George V, his daughter Princess Victoria, his brother the Duke of Connaught, and his nephew the German Emperor. The remainder of the funeral party waited outside the Hall, consisting of thousands of people. Big Ben, the bell in the nearby clock tower, was rung 68 times, one for each year of Edward VII's life. This was the first time it was used in this way at a monarch's funeral.

The whole procession then proceeded from Westminster Hall, via Whitehall and the Mall, from Hyde Park Corner up to the Marble Arch, and thence to Paddington Station; from there, a funeral train conveyed the mourners to Windsor. The mourners used the Royal Train, which together with the funeral car built for Queen Victoria, was hauled by the GWR 4000 Class locomotive King Edward. From the station, the procession then continued on to Windsor Castle, and a full funeral ceremony was held in St George's Chapel. The funeral service followed the format used for Queen Victoria, except that it included the interment within the chapel, whereas Victoria had been interred at Royal Mausoleum, Frogmore. The liturgy was closely based on the Order for The Burial of the Dead from the Book of Common Prayer. Queen Alexandra had specifically requested an anthem by Sir Arthur Sullivan, Brother, thou art gone before us, however Archbishop Davidson and other senior clerics thought that the piece lacked sufficient gravitas and Alexandra was persuaded to accept instead His Body Is Buried In Peace, the chorus from George Frideric Handel's Funeral Anthem For Queen Caroline. Alexandra also requested two hymns that were sung by the congregation, My God, my Father, while I stray and Now the labourer's task is o'er; this was an innovation at royal state funerals.

The funeral directors to the Royal Household appointed to assist during this occasion were the family business of William Banting of St James's Street, London. The Banting family also conducted the funerals of King George III in 1820, King George IV in 1830, the Duke of Gloucester in 1834, the Duke of Wellington in 1852, Prince Albert in 1861, Prince Leopold in 1884, and Queen Victoria in 1901. The royal undertaking warrant for the Banting family ended in 1928 with the retirement of William Westport Banting.

Edward's body was temporarily interred in the Royal Vault at Windsor under the Albert Memorial Chapel. On the instructions of Queen Alexandra in 1919, a monument in the South Aisle was designed and executed by Bertram Mackennal, featuring tomb effigies of the King and Queen in white marble mounted on a black and green marble sarcophagus, where both bodies were interred two years after the Queen Mother's death on 22 April 1927. Their caskets had been placed in front of the altar in the Albert Memorial Chapel after Alexandra's death in November 1925. The monument includes a depiction of Edward's favourite dog, Caesar, lying at his feet.

People in the procession

The funeral was notable for the enormous number of important European and world royalty who participated in it. Including other participants, 70 states were represented. The funeral procession saw a horseback procession, followed by 11 carriages. Caesar, the late King's dogs led the funeral procession with a highlander walking behind the carriage that carried the King's coffin.

Guests
As per report in London Gazette.

British royal family
Queen Alexandra, the late king's widow
The King and Queen of the United Kingdom, the late king's son and daughter-in-law
The Duke of Cornwall, the late King's grandson
The Prince Albert, the late King's grandson
The Princess Mary, the late king's granddaughter
The Prince Henry, the late king's grandson
The Princess Royal and the Duke of Fife, the late king's daughter and son-in-law
Princess Alexandra, the late king's granddaughter
Princess Maud, the late king's granddaughter
The Princess Victoria, the late king's daughter
 The Queen and King of Norway, the late king's daughter and son-in-law (also nephew)
Princess and Prince Christian of Schleswig-Holstein, the late king's sister and brother-in-law
Prince Albert of Schleswig-Holstein, the late king's nephew
Princess Helena Victoria of Schleswig-Holstein, the late king's niece
Princess Marie Louise of Schleswig-Holstein, the late king's niece
The Princess Louise, Duchess of Argyll and the Duke of Argyll, the late king's sister and brother-in-law
The Duke and Duchess of Connaught and Strathearn, the late king's brother and sister-in-law
Prince Arthur of Connaught, the late king's nephew
Princess Patricia of Connaught, the late king's niece
Princess Henry of Battenberg, the late king's sister
Prince Alexander of Battenberg, the late king's nephew
Prince Maurice of Battenberg, the late king's nephew
 The King of Spain, the late king's nephew-in-law
The Dowager Duchess of Albany, the late king's sister-in-law
 The Duke and Duchess of Saxe-Coburg and Gotha (Duke and Duchess of Albany), the late king's nephew and niece-in-law (also half-first cousin twice removed)
Prince Alexander of Teck, the late king's nephew-in-law (also second cousin)
Princess and Prince Louis of Battenberg, the late king's niece and nephew-in-law
 Princess and Prince Andrew of Greece and Denmark, the late king's great-niece and the late king's nephew
Princess Louise of Battenberg, the late king's great-niece
Prince George of Battenberg, the late king's great-nephew
Princess Victor of Hohenlohe-Langenburg, widow of the late king's half-first cousin
Countess Feodora Gleichen, the late king's half-first cousin once removed
Count Edward Gleichen, the late king's half-first cousin once removed
The Duke and Duchess of Teck, the late king's second cousin and his wife
Prince Francis of Teck, the late king's second cousin

Foreign royalty
 The German Emperor, the late king's nephew
 Prince Henry of Prussia, the late king's nephew
 The Grand Duke of Hesse and by Rhine, the late king's nephew
 The Crown Prince of Romania, the late King's nephew-in-law (representing the King of the Romanians)
 The King of Denmark, the late king's brother-in-law
 The Duke of Västergötland, the late king's nephew-in-law (representing the King of Sweden)
 The King of the Hellenes, the late king's brother-in-law
 The Duke of Sparta, the late king's nephew
 Prince Christopher of Greece and Denmark, the late king's nephew
 Dowager Empress Maria Feodorovna of Russia, the late king's sister-in-law
 Grand Duke Michael Alexandrovich of Russia, the late king's nephew (representing the Russian Emperor)
Prince George William of Hanover and Cumberland, the late king's nephew
 Prince Maximilian of Baden, the late king's nephew-in-law (representing the Grand Duke of Baden)
 The Tsar of the Bulgarians, the late king's second cousin
 The King of the Belgians, the late king's second cousin
 The Grand Duke of Mecklenburg-Strelitz, the late king's second cousin
 The Hereditary Grand Duke of Mecklenburg-Strelitz, the late king's second cousin once removed
 The Crown Prince of Montenegro, husband of the late king's second cousin once removed (representing the Prince of Montenegro)
 Prince Philipp of Saxe-Coburg and Gotha, the late king's second cousin
 Prince Leopold Clement of Saxe-Coburg and Gotha, the late king's second cousin once removed
The Count of Eu, the late king's second cousin
Prince Luís of Orléans-Braganza, the late king's second cousin once removed
The Duke of Alençon, the late king's second cousin
The Duke of Vendôme, the late king's second cousin once removed
 Duke Albrecht of Württemberg, the late king's second cousin once removed (representing the King of Württemberg)
 The King of Portugal, the late king's second cousin twice removed
The Prince of Waldeck and Pyrmont, brother of the late king's sister-in-law
Prince Wolrad of Waldeck and Pyrmont, half-brother of the late king's sister-in-law
 Archduke Franz Ferdinand of Austria (representing the Emperor of Austria)
 The Crown Prince of the Ottoman Empire (representing the Ottoman Sultan)
 The Duke of Aosta (representing the King of Italy)
 Prince Fushimi Sadanaru (representing the Emperor of Japan)
 Prince Rupprecht of Bavaria (representing the Prince Regent of Bavaria)
 The Crown Prince of Serbia (representing the King of Serbia)
 Prince Henry of the Netherlands (representing the Queen of the Netherlands)
 Prince Johann Georg of Saxony (representing the King of Saxony)
 Prince Mohammed Ali of Egypt (representing the Khedive of Egypt and Sudan)
 Prince Bovaradej of Siam (representing the King of Siam)
 Prince Zaitao of China (representing the Emperor of China)
 Grand Duke Michael Mikhailovich of Russia
The Duke of Penthièvre
The Prince Kinsky of Wchinitz and Tettau

Other dignitaries
 Former President Theodore Roosevelt, representing the United States
 Foreign Affairs Minister Stephen Pichon, representing the French Republic
 Samad Khan Momtaz os-Saltaneh, representing Persia
Sir George Reid, High Commissioner of Australia to the United Kingdom and former Prime Minister of Australia

Nobility

The Duke of Norfolk
The Duke of Beaufort
The Duke of Bedford
The Duke of Montrose
The Duke of Northumberland
The Duke of Richmond and Gordon
The Duchess of Buccleuch
The Marquess of Cholmondeley
The Marquess of Ripon
The Marquess of Breadalbane
The Marquess of Hertford
The Marquess of Londonderry
The Marquess of Salisbury
The Earl of Granard
The Earl Beauchamp
The Earl of Dundonald
The Earl Granville
The Earl of Liverpool
The Earl Howe
The Earl of Gosford
The Earl of Shaftesbury
The Earl Roberts
The Earl of Albemarle
The Earl of Harrington
The Earl of Stradbroke
The Earl Fortescue
The Earl of Scarbrough
The Earl of Kilmorey
The Earl Brownlow
The Earl of Harewood
The Earl of Clarendon
The Earl of Haddington
The Earl of Kintore
The Earl of Leicester
The Earl Cawdor
The Earl of Rosebery
The Earl of Denbigh
The Viscount Althorp
The Viscount Esher
The Viscount Kitchener
The Viscount Galway
The Viscount Churchill
The Lord Grenfell
The Lord Acton
The Lord Suffield
The Lord Farquhar
The Lord Colebrooke
The Lord Herschell
The Lord Allendale
The Lord Denman
The Lord Knollys
The Lord Wenlock
The Lord Lovat
The Lord Harris
The Lord Belper
The Lord Fisher
The Lord Strathcona and Mount Royal
The Lord Hamilton of Dalzell
The Lord Tweedmouth
Lord Marcus Beresford
Lord Charles Fitzmaurice
Lord Walter Kerr
Lord Algernon Percy
The Hon. Seymour Fortescue
The Hon. Henry Legge
The Hon. Edmund Fremantle
The Hon. Arthur Walsh
The Hon. Sir Hedworth Lambton
The Hon. Derek Keppel
The Hon. Charles Wentworth-FitzWilliam
The Hon. Sir Assheton Curzon-Howe

See also
 Death and state funeral of Queen Victoria
 Death and state funeral of George V
 Death and state funeral of George VI
 Death and state funeral of Elizabeth II
 State funerals in the United Kingdom

References

Notes

Sources

 
 
 
 The Times, May 21, 1910

Edward VII
1910 in Europe
1910 in the United Kingdom
1910s in the City of Westminster
Articles containing video clips
European court festivities
Events involving British royalty
Edward VII
May 1910 events
Edward VII
Westminster Abbey